Hooteroll? is a jazz-rock fusion album by Howard Wales and Jerry Garcia.

Prior to making Hooteroll?, Wales and Garcia had played together at Monday night jam sessions at The Matrix in San Francisco.  Wales had also played organ on several tracks of the Grateful Dead album American Beauty.

Hooteroll? features a few musicians who later played in Jerry Garcia side projects — John Kahn (Jerry Garcia Band and many other Garcia related groups), Bill Vitt (Merl Saunders and Jerry Garcia), and Martin Fierro (Legion of Mary).

Cover

The cover art is a painting by Abdul Mati Klarwein titled Saint John.  The same painting is also on the cover of the Jam & Spoon album Kaleidoscope.  Other paintings by Klarwein were used for the cover and gatefold art of the Miles Davis album Bitches Brew.

The inside cover of the album depicts a photograph of Jerry Garcia and Howard Wales smoking on an outdoor sofa.  The photo is evidently reversed as Jerry Garcia's missing finger appears on his "left" as opposed to his "right" hand.

Different versions of the album

Hooteroll? was originally released in 1971 as an LP on the Douglas Records label.  In 1987 it was released on CD and cassette by Rykodisc Records.  This version of the album has a markedly different track listing from the LP, with two songs added and one removed.  In 1992 the CD was reissued by Grateful Dead Records.  On September 14, 2010, Douglas Records reissued the album again, restoring the missing track "A Trip to What Next" (and retaining the two added to the 1987 CD), and adding two live bonus tracks from the Palace Theatre in Providence, Rhode Island recorded on January 28, 1972. The song "Da Birg Song" is listed on this version as "Da Bird Song". Also, the song "DC-502" had a 0:44 keyboard intro on the original vinyl LP which was cut on the CD versions.

Track listing

All compositions are by Howard Wales, except "South Side Strut" by Martin Fierro and Howard Wales and "Da Birg Song" by Jerry Garcia and Howard Wales.

LP track listing

Side 1
 "South Side Strut" – 5:38
 "A Trip to What Next" – 7:28
 "Up from the Desert" – 3:03
Side 2
 "DC-502" – 4:24
 "One A.M. Approach" – 4:39
 "Uncle Martin's" – 3:09
 "Da Birg Song" – 2:35

1987 CD track listing

 "Morning in Marin" – 6:59
 "Da Birg Song" – 2:37
 "South Side Strut" – 5:39
 "Up from the Desert" – 3:03
 "DC-502" – 3:38
 "One A.M. Approach" – 4:39
 "Uncle Martin's" – 3:39
 "Evening in Marin" – 4:09

2010 CD track listing

 "Morning in Marin" – 7:05
 "Da Bird Song" – 2:43
 "South Side Strut" – 5:45
 "Up from the Desert" – 3:08
 "A Trip to What Next" – 7:26
 "DC-502" – 3:45
 "One A.M. Approach" – 4:45
 "Uncle Martin's" – 3:15
 "Evening in Marin" – 4:18
 "She Once Lived Here" (live, 1972) – 4:48
 "Sweet Cocaine" (live, 1972) – 12:49

Personnel

Musicians

 Howard Wales – organ, piano
 Jerry Garcia – guitar
 John Kahn – bass
 Curly Cook – guitar
 Bill Vitt – drums
 Michael Marinelli – drums
 Ken Balzall – trumpet
 Martin Fierro – saxophone, flute

Production

 Produced by: Alan Douglas and Doris Dynamite
 Horn arrangements: Martin Fierro
 Recording engineer: Russ Geary
 Mixing engineer: Tony Bongiovi
 Cover painting: Abdul Mati
 Photographs: Ron Rakow
 CD digital mastering: Joe Gastwirt
 CD package design: J.E. Tully

References

Howard Wales albums
Jerry Garcia albums
1971 albums
Albums produced by Alan Douglas (record producer)
Collaborative albums
Rykodisc albums
Grateful Dead Records albums
Albums with cover art by Mati Klarwein